The Jesse Colley Track/Soccer Complex was built in 2003.  The complex includes a full-size soccer field, an eight-lane Athletic Polymer Systems Tartan surface on the 400-meter track, four long jump/triple jump pits, men's and women's pole vault facilities and high jump pits, an inside steeplechase water jump, a triple-ring throwing area for the discus, shot put and hammer throw, and an Olympic-caliber cage around the discus and hemmer throw facilities.

The facility is also capable of hosting sprints in either direction and has a dual javelin approach.

The addition of the facility has enabled Troy University to host several events that range from the Coach "O" Invitational, the Special Olympics, the Alabama High School Athletic Association (AHSAA) State Championships, and the US Junior National State Championships.

The Jesse H. Colley Track/Soccer Complex, which surrounds Troy's NCAA regulation soccer field, cost approximately $1 million to build.

The facility was renovated in 2005 to feature a press box that is used for both soccer and track events.  The press box is located above a grand stand that seats 500 people.  The soccer pitch consists of Bermuda grass and measures 115 yards by 75 yards with FIFA World Cup style goals.  Also added in 2006 were soccer offices and locker rooms, to go along with concession stands and restrooms.  The soccer locker room features a team lounge, that includes a state-of-the-art video and sound system.

The improvements of 2006 follow the original construction of the facility in 2003.  Added for 2008 were Kwik-Goal Referee Shelters and Team Shelters for both teams.

Gallery

References

Troy University
Soccer venues in Alabama
College soccer venues in the United States
College track and field venues in the United States
2003 establishments in Alabama
Sports venues completed in 2003